Catching Flies (born 1991) is an English musician, DJ and record producer from London, England. His sound has been described as sitting on the "smooth, mellow side of electronic music" somewhere "between Flying Lotus and Bonobo" and "contains shades of everything from hip hop to house, from soul to jazz." He has self-released three EPs and numerous remixes for artists like Kwabs and Wilkinson.

Releases
Catching Flies first came to prominence in October 2012, when his remix of Mt. Wolf's track "Life Size Ghosts" began to get hundreds of thousands of hits on YouTube and he got praise from scores of music blogs. Consequently, the track raced to the number one spot on the Hype Machine.

This was followed by the release of his first EP, The Stars, which included 3 tracks of original music, plus the Mt. Wolf remix. The EP was released by Catching Flies for free on Bandcamp and received thousands of downloads.

June 2013 saw the release of The Long Journey Home EP, again comprising three original tracks and one remix. This was self-released through his own label, Indigo Soul, on Bandcamp. Both EPs were officially released on Spotify and iTunes in November 2013.

He has since received radio support from Gilles Peterson, Annie Mac, Mary Anne Hobbes, Lauren Laverne and Huw Stephens.

In 2016, Catching Flies released a mini EP, consisting of two instrumental songs: Komorebi and Mama's Wisdom. ‘Komorebi’ took Catching Flies to #1 on HypeMachine again. The track has subsequently been sampled by US Hip-Hop sensation Phora in 'R U Still' on his debut album ‘Yours Truly Forever’ which debuted at No.1 on the US Hip Hop Charts. Mama's Wisdom was originally premiered in Bonobo’s BBC Radio One Essential Mix.

Ahead of his debut album scheduled for release in 2019, Catching Flies released a new single in September 2018 featuring Oscar Jerome and Jay Prince. It was described as a 'jazz-soul-infused electro lullaby' by The Guardian and awarded their 'Hot Tracks' pick. This was followed by "Satisfied" in November 2018, ‘an intoxicating slice of dance music that gets a big boost from euphoric, gospel-y vocal samples’ (Bandcamp – New & Notable releases). ‘Satisfied’ has been supported and celebrated by the likes of Bonobo and George Fitzgerald (on his BBC Radio 1 Residency show). The release was accompanied by a short film about Catching Flies and his creative process, shot on 16mm film. It premiered on Nowness and received their pick of the day.

Catching Flies' debut album Silver Linings was released on 5 July 2019. Future Music called it ‘a brilliantly eclectic record… a moving journey that will last long in the memory.’ Earmilk gave the album 8.5/10 stars and dubbed it ‘A soundtrack to summertime…' and Clash (magazine) summarised: ‘Killer beats, a dreamy, atmospheric sound, and artfully orchestrated introspection.’ 

Catching Flies released 'Silver Linings Remixed' on 17 April 2020. The album also includes a new track 'Daymarks' and a version of 'Yu' featuring Jehst and Blu. He appeared on Mary Anne Hobbs' BBC Radio 6 Music show on 17 April 2020 to speak about the release.

In March 2021, he was nominated for a BAFTA for his soundtrack work on the Playstation game 'Sackboy.'

Performances
Catching Flies has performed both DJ and Live shows at venues and festivals throughout the UK, Europe, and Asia. In 2017, he toured Asia for the first time, playing gigs in India, China and Singapore. He has done online mixes for Vice, Oki-Ni and Mixmag. His mix for the Solid Steel series was awarded second prize for 'Mix of The Year.' He also recorded a mix entitled 'The Soundtrack To The Film Of Your Imaginary Life' for ID Magazine and gave an interview.

In March 2014 he debuted his solo live show as the support act on Bonobo's European Tour. He has also appeared on bills with Four Tet, Jon Hopkins, Little Dragon, George Fitzgerald, Actress & more. He concluded 'The Long Journey Home' tour with a sold out show with Submotion Orchestra at London's Barbican Centre in the Barbican Hall, helping to close the London Jazz Festival.

In 2018, he was nominated for a UMA in the 'Best Electronic Act' category.

Discography

Albums
 Silver Linings (Indigo Soul, 2019)
 Silver Linings Remixed (Indigo Soul, 2020)

EPs
 The Stars (Indigo Soul, 2012)
 The Long Journey Home (Indigo Soul, 2013)
 Komorebi/Mama's Wisdom (Indigo Soul, 2016)
New Gods (Indigo Soul, 2018)
Satisfied (Indigo Soul, 2018)

Collaborations
 Catching Flies & Ifan Dafydd – 'Don't Know How' (Push & Run, 2013)
 Submotion Orchestra ft. Catching Flies - 'Ao' (Counter Records/Ninja Tune, 2016)
Catching Flies ft. Jay Prince & Oscar Jerome - New Gods (Indigo Soul, 2018)

Remixes
 Mt. Wolf – "Life Size Ghosts" (Indigo Soul, 2012)
 Jill Scott – "Golden" (White Label, 2012)
 Louis M^ttrs – "War With Heaven" (Virgin EMI Records, 2013)
 Rainy Milo – "Rats" (Virgin EMI Records, 2013)
 Wilkinson – "Too Close" (RAM Records, 2013)
 Kwabs - Perfect Ruin (Warner Music, 2015)
 Instupendo - Save (Instupendo, 2017)
 Klangstof - Hostage (Mind Of A Genius/Warner Brothers, 2017)
Yoste - Chihiro (2018)

References

1991 births
English electronic musicians
English record producers
English DJs
Living people
British trip hop musicians
Downtempo musicians
Electronic dance music DJs